Birger Steen (9 April 1907 – 25 August 1949) was a Norwegian footballer. He played in seven matches for the Norway national football team from 1926 to 1934.

References

External links
 

1907 births
1949 deaths
Norwegian footballers
Norway international footballers
Place of birth missing
Association footballers not categorized by position